The 1953 Stanford Indians baseball team represented Stanford University in the 1953 NCAA baseball season. The Indians played their home games at Sunken Diamond. The team was coached by Everett Dean in his 4th year at Stanford.

The Indians won the District VIII Playoff to advanced to the College World Series, where they were defeated by the Lafayette Leopards.

Roster

Schedule 

! style="" | Regular Season
|- valign="top" 

|- align="center" bgcolor="#ccffcc"
|  || March 27 || at  || Bovard Field • Los Angeles, California || 7–1 || – || –
|- align="center" bgcolor="#ccffcc"
|  || March 28 || at Southern California || Bovard Field • Los Angeles, California || 5–2 || – || –
|-

|- align="center" bgcolor="#ffcccc"
|  || April  ||  || Unknown • Unknown || 0–1 || – || –
|- align="center" bgcolor="#ffcccc"
|  || April  || UCLA || Unknown • Unknown || 4–12 || – || –
|- align="center" bgcolor="#ccffcc"
|  || April 24 || Southern California || Sunken Diamond • Stanford, California || 11–10 || – || –
|-

|- align="center" bgcolor="#ccffcc"
|  || May  || UCLA || Unknown • Unknown || 2–0 || – || –
|- align="center" bgcolor="#ffcccc"
|  || May  || UCLA || Unknown • Unknown || 6–10 || – || –
|-

|-
|-
! style="" | Postseason
|- valign="top"

|- align="center" bgcolor="#ffcccc"
| 34 || June 11 || vs Michigan || Omaha Municipal Stadium • Omaha, Nebraska || 0–4 || 28–4–2 || 10–6
|- align="center" bgcolor="#ccffcc"
| 35 || June 12 || vs Houston || Omaha Municipal Stadium • Omaha, Nebraska || 7–6 || 29–4–2 || 10–6
|- align="center" bgcolor="#ffcccc"
| 36 || June 13 || vs Lafayette || Omaha Municipal Stadium • Omaha, Nebraska || 3–4 || 29–5–2 || 10–6
|-

Awards and honors 
Jack Shepard
 First Team All-American American Baseball Coaches Association

References 

Stanford Cardinal baseball seasons
Stanford Indians baseball
College World Series seasons
Stanford
Pac-12 Conference baseball champion seasons